Greg Lovelady (born January 11, 1979) in an American baseball coach, who is the current head baseball coach of the UCF Knights.

Lovelady played college baseball at Miami (FL), where as a catcher and four-year letter winner, he won the 1999 College World Series and 2001 College World Series.  He signed as an undrafted free agent with the Florida Marlins organization, and played one season with the Utica Blue Sox before turning to coaching.  He served three more years at Miami, working with catchers.  In his seven years in Coral Gables, the Hurricanes reached five College World Series, winning two, and appeared in the Super Regional round all seven years.  In 2005, Lovelady accepted an assistant coach position at Wright State.  Two years later, he added associate head coach duties.  With Rob Cooper's move to Penn State, Lovelady was elevated to the top job.

Head coaching record
Below is a table of Lovelady's yearly records as an NCAA head baseball coach.

See also
 List of current NCAA Division I baseball coaches

References

External links

1979 births
Living people
Baseball catchers
UCF Knights baseball coaches
Miami Hurricanes baseball coaches
Miami Hurricanes baseball players
Utica Blue Sox players
Wright State Raiders baseball coaches
Baseball players from Miami
Sports coaches from Miami